İsmail Demiriz (born 1 April 1962) is a Turkish former football player, who played as a right-back, and manager.

In 2019, Demiriz was convicted in Turkey and sentenced to prison for over a half-dozen years for his affiliations with Hizmet, a self-described transnational association based on moral principles and outlawed in Turkey as allegedly an "armed terrorist group."

Professional career
Demiriz spent his whole career in Turkey and is best known for his stint with Galatasaray, for whom he played 251 times and scored seven times. He helped Galatasaray win three Süper Lig titles, and ten other domestic titles. He was briefly a manager after retiring from football.

Other Interests
In September 2016, Demiriz was charged with being part of a Gülenist terrorist organization and detained in Istanbul.

Honours
Galatasaray
Turkish Federation Cup (2): 1984-85, 1990-91
Prime Minister's Cup (2): 1985-86, 1989-90
Süper Lig (3): 1986-87, 1987-88, 1992-93
Turkish Super Cup (2): 1986-87, 1987-88
TSYD Cup (3): 1987-88, 1991-92, 1992-93
Turkish Cup (1): 1992-93

References

External links
 
 
 TFF Manager Profile

1962 births
Living people
People from Turgutlu
People imprisoned on charges of terrorism
Turkish footballers
Turkey international footballers
Turkey youth international footballers
Turkish football managers
Association football fullbacks
Galatasaray S.K. footballers
Gençlerbirliği S.K. footballers
Gülen movement
Süper Lig players
TFF First League players
Süper Lig managers
Kasımpaşa S.K. managers
Kardemir Karabükspor managers